Inovel Romero Valdes (born January 28, 1995) is a Cuban male volleyball player. He was part of the Cuba men's national volleyball team at the 2014 FIVB Volleyball Men's World Championship in Poland.

Defection
Along with Félix Chapman, he defected in the United States after they won the bronze medal in the 2015 NORCECA Champions Cup in Detroit, Michigan, asking Political asylum in that country.

Clubs
 Ciego de Ávila (2014)

References

1995 births
Living people
Cuban men's volleyball players
Place of birth missing (living people)
Central American and Caribbean Games bronze medalists for Cuba
Competitors at the 2014 Central American and Caribbean Games
Central American and Caribbean Games medalists in volleyball